Maurice Francis McAuliffe (June 17, 1875 – December 15, 1944) was an American clergyman of the Catholic Church. He served as Bishop of Hartford from 1934 until his death in 1944.

Biography
Maurice McAuliffe was born in Hartford, Connecticut, to Daniel and Catherine (née Noonan) McAuliffe. He graduated from St. Peter's School, Hartford, staffed by the Sisters of Mercy, and Hartford Public High School in 1894, and attended Mount St. Mary's College in Emmitsburg, Maryland, for a year. He then continued his studies at the Grand Seminary of Saint-Sulpice in Issy, France, and at the University of Eichstätt in Germany. He was ordained to the priesthood on July 29, 1900.

Following his return to Connecticut, he was appointed to the faculty of St. Thomas Seminary in Bloomfield. He served as vice-president of the seminary from 1906 until 1921, when he was advanced to president. He was named a domestic prelate in 1924.

On December 17, 1925, McAuliffe was appointed Auxiliary Bishop of Hartford and Titular Bishop of Dercos by Pope Pius XI. He received his episcopal consecration on April 28, 1926, from Bishop John Joseph Nilan, with Bishops John Murray and William A. Hickey serving as co-consecrators, at St. Joseph's Cathedral. He selected as his episcopal motto: In Caritate Dei (Latin: "In Love of God"). Following the death of Bishop Nilan, McAuliffe was named the eighth Bishop of Hartford on April 23, 1934.

During his ten-year-long tenure, he established twenty-five parishes, nine parochial schools, and several junior high schools. He was also responsible for St. Joseph's College in West Hartford, Annhurst College in South Woodstock, St. Basil's College in Stamford, and Fairfield College Preparatory School in Fairfield. He organized the campaign to raise $1 million for improvements to St. Francis Hospital in Hartford. He also founded St. Joseph's Hospital in Stamford. McAuliffe was a supporter of the Legion of Decency/

McAuliffe was admitted to St. Francis Hospital on December 3, 1944, and placed in an oxygen tent. He later died at age 69.

McAuliffe Hall on the campus of Fairfield University is named in honor of Bishop McAuliffe, who sanctioned the creation of the university in 1941.  The Knight of Columbus Council 3181 - Bishop Maurice F. McAuliffe in Windsor, Connecticut
is also named in his honor.

See also

References

External links
Archdiocese of Hartford

1944 deaths
1875 births
20th-century Roman Catholic bishops in the United States
Mount St. Mary's University alumni
Seminary of Saint-Sulpice (France) alumni
Roman Catholic bishops of Hartford
Fairfield University people
American Roman Catholic archbishops